Varun Sharma (born 1990) is an Indian actor and comedian.

Varun Sharma may also refer to:

 Varun Sharma (cricketer) (born 1987), Indian cricketer
 Varun Sharma (actor) (born 1994), Indian television actor

See also 
 Varun (disambiguation)